The 2008 Summer Paralympic Games, the 13th  Summer Paralympic Games, took place in Beijing, China from September 6 to 17, 2008. As with the 2008 Summer Olympics, equestrian events were held in Hong Kong and sailing events in Qingdao. It was first time the new Paralympic logo featured in the Summer Paralympics since its rebranding after the 2004 Summer Paralympics.

3,951 athletes from 146 countries took part, the largest number of nations ever (ten more than the 2004 Games in Athens). Five countries competed for the first time. As host country, China fielded more athletes than any other country. The slogan for the 2008 Paralympics was the same as the 2008 Summer Olympics, "One World, One Dream" ( Pinyin Tóng yīge shìjìe tóng yīge mèngxiǎng, lit. "One World, One Dream"). China dominated the medal count, finishing with 89 gold medals and 211 total medals, more than double the next-ranked NPC in both cases. 339 Paralympic records and 279 world records were broken. International Paralympic Committee (IPC) President Philip Craven declared the Games "the greatest Paralympic Games ever."

Beijing was selected to host the 2022 Winter Paralympics, making it the first city to host both Summer and Winter Games.

Venues

Nineteen competition venues were selected—seventeen in Beijing, one in Hong Kong, and one in Qingdao.

Beijing National Stadium (Birds Nest) - Athletics, Opening and closing ceremonies
Beijing National Aquatics Center (Water Cube) - Swimming
Beijing National Indoor Stadium (Fan) - Wheelchair basketball
Fencing Gymnasium of Olympic Green Convention Centre - Boccia, Wheelchair fencing
Olympic Green Archery Field - Archery
Olympic Green Hockey Field - Football 5-a-side, Football 7-a-side
Olympic Green Tennis Centre (Flowers) - Wheelchair tennis
Peking University Gymnasium - Table tennis
Beihang University Gymnasium - Powerlifting
China Agricultural University Gymnasium - Sitting volleyball
Beijing Science and Technology University Gymnasium - Wheelchair rugby
Beijing Institute of Technology Gymnasium - Goalball
Beijing Shooting Range Hall - Shooting
Laoshan Velodrome - Cycling (track)
Workers Gymnasium - Judo
Shunyi Olympic Rowing-Canoeing Park - Rowing
Triathlon Venue - Cycling (road)
Hong Kong Equestrian Venues - Equestrian
Qingdao International Sailing Centre - Sailing

Symbols

Emblem
The Games's emblem, "Sky, Earth, and Human Beings", was unveiled in July 2004, a multicolored Chinese character "之" stylized as an athletic figure in motion.  Its red, blue and green colors represent sun, sky and earth.

Slogan
The slogan was the same as the 2008 Summer Olympics, "One World, One Dream".

Mascots
The mascot was a cartoon cow named Fu Niu Lele, roughly meaning "Lucky Ox 'Happy'".

Theme song
The theme song was "Flying with the Dream" . It was performed by Chinese-Tibetan singer Han Hong and Hong Kong singer and actor Andy Lau.

Torch relay

The torch relay of the 2008 Summer Paralympics started from Tian Tan (Temple of Heaven) on August 28. The flame then gathered before The Hall of Prayer for Good Harvests (祈年殿) and followed two routes (the "Route of Ancient China" and the "Route of Modern China"). Both routes returned to Beijing on September 5, and the torch was flamed at the National Stadium during the Opening Ceremony on September 6.

The Games

Opening ceremony

The opening ceremony took place on September 6, 2008. The pre-ceremony performance was a succession of various musical performances, ranging from military music to folk music and a performance of Ode to Joy. Following a countdown, a fireworks display signalled the beginning of the ceremony proper. The national flag of China was then raised, in accordance with usual protocol, and the national anthem of China performed.  Performers wearing suits in bright colours paraded round the stadium, as a welcoming ceremony preceding the athletes' entry. As with the 2008 Summer Olympics, the ceremony included a parade of nations, with a flag bearer for each national team. Contrary to Olympic tradition, the national team of Greece did not enter first, as the Paralympic Games traces its roots to Stoke Mandeville rather than Olympia; the host country, as is customary in both Olympic and Paralympic Games, came last. As Chinese is written in characters and not letters, the order of the teams' entry was determined by the number of strokes in the first character of their respective countries' Simplified Chinese names.  Countries with the same number of strokes in the first character are sorted by those of the next character. This made Guinea (几内亚) the first country to enter as it takes two strokes to write the first character in the country's name (几).  Following the athletes' parade, a performance took place, divided into chapters and sub-chapters entitled the "Journey of Space" and "Journey of Life" The sunbird performance entailed Yang Haitao (杨海涛), a singer with a visual impairment, singing about dreams while an acrobat in sunbird costume descended in simulated flight from the air and "awakened the blind singer from his sleep".  The ceremony concludes with Hou Bin, the first Chinese paralympian to be three-time champion  consecutively in the same event, lifted himself and his wheelchair up on a rope by strength of arms to the top of Beijing National Stadium, where he lit the cauldron to mark the beginning of the Games.

Closing ceremony

The 2008 Summer Paralympics closing ceremony was held at the Beijing National Stadium. It began at 8:00 pm China Standard Time (UTC+8) on September 17, 2008.

Sports
Twenty sports were on the program:

 Archery
 Athletics
 Boccia
 Cycling
 Equestrian
 Football 5-a-side
 Football 7-a-side
 Goalball
 Judo
 Powerlifting
 Rowing
 Sailing
 Shooting
 Swimming
 Table tennis
 Volleyball
 Wheelchair basketball
 Wheelchair fencing
 Wheelchair rugby
 Wheelchair tennis

Rowing made its first appearance in the Paralympics at these games.

Calendar

Participating NPCs
The following National Paralympic Committees sent delegations to compete. Macau and the Faroe Islands are members of the International Paralympic Committee, but not of the International Olympic Committee; hence they participate in the Paralympic Games but not in the Olympics.

Burundi, Gabon, Georgia, Haiti and Montenegro participated in the Paralympics for the first time.

Botswana was due to take part, but its single athlete, defending Paralympic champion sprinter Tshotlego Morama, withdrew prior to the Games due to injury. The country's last-minute attempt to field other athletes in her place was rejected, as they did not meet the requirement of having participated in international events.

Medal count 

This table is based on the medal count of the International Paralympic Committee (IPC).

The ranking is sorted primarily by the number of gold medals earned by a National Paralympic Committee. The number of silver medals is taken into consideration next and then the number of bronze medals. If countries are still tied, equal ranking is given and they are listed alphabetically by IPC Country Code.

Events highlights

International television
  – Australian Broadcasting Corporation (ABC)'s ABC Television provided coverage on ABC Australian National Television's ABN-2.
  – SporTV2 and Terra Networks.
  – Canadian Broadcasting Corporation (CBC) in English and Société Radio Canada (SRC) in French.
  – Chinese Central Television (CCTV) provided coverage on CCTV-1 (opening and closing ceremony), CCTV-5 and CCTV-7 as all direct live telecast transmission.
  – Eurosport
  – NHK's NHK General TV provided coverage on JOAK-1
  – AZTV
  – NRK
  – Sveriges Television
  – TRT
  – Universal Sports
  – BBC provided coverage on BBC Television's BBC One.

In France, following the Games, Philippe Juvin, national secretary of the governing Union for a Popular Movement, accused national public television network France Télévisions of having practiced "segregation" by providing live coverage of the Beijing Olympics but only ten-minute daily summaries of events, outside prime time, for the Beijing Paralympics. France Télévisions replied that it would take Juvin to court for slander.

See also

 2007 Summer Special Olympics
 2008 Summer Olympics
 2009 Summer Deaflympics
 2022 Winter Paralympics

References

External links

Beijing 2008 Paralympic Games Official Site
International Paralympic Committee
Paralympic Online Streaming Coverage

 
Summer Paralympics
Paralympics
Sports competitions in Beijing
Summer Paralympics
Paralympics
2000s in Beijing
Multi-sport events in China
Summer Paralympic Games
September 2008 sports events in Asia